Summer Dawn is an album by American jazz saxophonist/flautist Sahib Shihab recorded in 1964 for the Argo label.

Reception

The AllMusic site gave the album 3 stars.

Track listing
All compositions by Sahib Shihab.
 "Lillemore" - 7:58
 "Please Don't Leave Me" - 9:47
 "Waltz for Seth" - 6:19
 "Campi's Idea" - 8:27
 "Herr Fixit" - 5:31

Personnel 
Sahib Shihab - alto saxophone, baritone saxophone, flute
Åke Persson - trombone
Francy Boland - piano
Jimmy Woode - bass
Kenny Clarke - drums 
Joe Harris - bongos

References 

1964 albums
Sahib Shihab albums
Argo Records albums